The London Borough of Enfield is a London borough in North London. It borders the London boroughs of Barnet to the west, Haringey to the south, and Waltham Forest to the southeast. To the north are the districts of Hertsmere, Welwyn Hatfield and Broxbourne (in Hertfordshire), and to the east is Epping Forest District in Essex. The local authority is Enfield London Borough Council. Enfield's population is estimated to be 333,794; the main towns in the borough are Edmonton, Enfield, Southgate and Palmers Green. Enfield is the northernmost London borough.

Etymology
Enfield was recorded in Domesday Book in 1086 as Enefelde, and as Einefeld in 1214, Enfeld in 1293, and Enfild in 1564: that is 'open land of a man called Ēana', or 'where lambs are reared', from the Old English feld with an Old English personal name or with Old English ēan 'lamb'. The feld would have been a reference to an area cleared of trees within woodland that would later become known as Enfield Chase.

Historical
The current borough was created in 1965 from the former areas of the Municipal Borough of Southgate, the Municipal Borough of Enfield and the Municipal Borough of Edmonton. The armorial bearings of these three boroughs were also merged. The heraldic beast on the shield of the Enfield coat of arms is known in heraldry as an "Enfield" (or colloquially as the Enfield beast), and is used extensively as a logo representing Enfield, particularly by the borough council.

In Roman times, Enfield was connected to Londinium by Ermine Street, the great Roman road which stretched all the way up to York. Artefacts found in the early 1900s reveal that there were Roman settlements in the areas that are now Edmonton and Bush Hill Park.

In 790 King Offa of Mercia was recorded as giving the lands of Edmonton to St Albans Abbey. The area became strategically important as East Anglia was taken over by the Danes. In the 790s strongholds were built by men loyal to King Alfred the Great, in order to keep the Danes to the east of the River Lea.

After the Norman Conquest, both Enfield and Edmonton were mentioned in Domesday Book. Both had churches, and Enfield had 400 inhabitants, Edmonton 300. Enfield is also described as having a "parc". This parc—a heavily forested area for hunting—was key to Enfield's existence in the Middle Ages (see Enfield Old Park). Wealthy Londoners came to Enfield first to hunt, and then to build houses in the green, wooded surroundings. In 1303, Edward I of England granted Enfield a charter to hold a weekly market, which has continued up to this day. The old market cross was removed in the early 20th century to make way for a monument to the coronation of King Edward VII, but was preserved by the horticulturalist E. A. Bowles for his garden at nearby Myddelton House, where it remains today.

Enfield Grammar School with its Tudor Old Hall stands next to the Enfield Town Market Place and St. Andrew's Church, the school having been extended several times since 1586. A new hall and further additions were completed shortly before World War II.

Nearby historically was the palace of Edward VI, where Elizabeth I lived while a princess, including during the final illness of Henry VIII. Edward was taken there to join her, so that in the company of his sister, Edward Seymour, 1st Earl of Hertford could break the news to Edward, formally announcing the death of their royal father in the presence chamber at Enfield, on his knees to make formal obeisance to the boy as King. Later Elizabeth held court there when she was queen (this was remembered in the name Palace Gardens that was a street running behind Pearsons department store and is still recalled in the name of Enfield's shopping centre).

Industry
Enfield has a history of armaments manufacture—see Royal Small Arms Factory. The Lee–Enfield .303 rifle was standard issue for the British Army until 1957, although its usage carried on afterwards for some time. Other firearms manufactured there include the Bren and Sten machine guns—the "en" in both cases denoting the place of manufacture.

The world's first solid state circuitry colour televisions were manufactured by Ferguson at their now closed plant in Enfield.

The first mass-produced dishwasher was manufactured in Hotpoint's now closed Enfield plant.

The Barclays Bank branch in Enfield was the first place in the world to have an ATM or cash machine; it was officially opened in June 1967 by Reg Varney, a television actor and personality most famous for his lead role in the comedy series On the Buses. This historical event was marked by a silver plaque on the wall of the bank, and later by an English Heritage Blue plaque.

A fine example of a grade II listed art deco factory building can be found along Southbury Road, with the former Ripaults Factory, now an office building for Travis Perkins.

Enfield today

The borough's Civic Centre is in Silver Street, Enfield Town, and is home to the council. Enfield Town is also home to the local credit union, North London Credit Union.

In 2007, Enfield Town centre completed a major redevelopment project under the name PalaceXchange while retaining the Palace Gardens Shopping Centre. An extension was added to the existing retail area with many new shops, and a second multi-storey car park was built along with a new road layout.

A major redevelopment of Edmonton Green including the shopping centre, and adjacent municipal housing over a wide area, started in 1999. This is still on-going, and provides new housing, health facilities, a new leisure centre, a supermarket, and many other civic features.

Many local activities are located around the A10 road, on the sites of former industrial enterprises, which has a number of large retail outlets and a large multiplex Cineworld cinema. The cinema also hosts Jubilee Church on a Sunday morning; whilst cinemagoers continue to watch films in the other screens, a charismatic church which draws its worshippers from a wide area, hiring several auditoria for worship.

The western part of Enfield is largely residential, with shopping centres in Southgate, Palmers Green and Cockfosters.

Parts of Enfield experienced rioting in August 2011, in which a private car and a van were set alight and completely destroyed, a police car vandalised (smashed windows) and a number of shops in Enfield Town Centre as well as others in the Enfield Retail Park being broken into and looted. The Sony Distribution Centre in the Innova Business Park, near Waltham Cross, was burnt to the ground. In September 2012, a year after the attack, a rebuilt Sony Distribution Centre was opened by the prime minister, David Cameron.

Demographics

Governance

Elections to Enfield Council take place every four years, there are 21 wards in the borough and three councillors are returned to each ward. Of the current 63 councillors there are 46 Labour members, 17 Conservatives meaning the Labour Group currently controls the council. The next Local Government Elections affecting Enfield will take place in 2022.

Public services

Health
Two major NHS hospitals, Chase Farm Hospital operated by the Royal Free London NHS Foundation Trust and North Middlesex Hospital operated by the North Middlesex University Hospital NHS Trust, are located in the borough.  NHS Enfield Clinical Commissioning Group is responsible for local primary health care, taking over this role from Enfield Primary Care NHS Trust in 2013. Another hospital in the borough, Highlands, was closed in 1993.

Education

Schools

The London Borough of Enfield is the education authority for the district. Education is provided in a mix of community, voluntary aided and state schools. A number of private schools are also located in the borough.

The borough is home to the well-renowned Enfield Grammar School, founded in 1558, which still uses its Tudor building which is now often referred to as the Old Hall. Enfield Grammar School is based in the center of Enfield Town. St Ignatius' College is the borough's largest Catholic school and one of the best-performing non-selective schools in the borough, at both GCSE and A-Level. Bishop Stopford's School is Enfield's largest school, and The College of Haringey, Enfield and North East London also has a campus in the borough.

In 2007 a new school named Oasis Academy Enfield was opened, following the takeover of Albany by the Oasis Company as Oasis Academy Hadley.
The Latymer School is another Grammar school in the borough, and is based in the Edmonton area.
Enfield County School is an all girls comprehensive school which sits opposite Enfield Grammar Boys school in Enfield town. It is a split site school with the lower years situated towards the area of Forty Hall.

University
Middlesex University, the former polytechnic, used to have two campuses in Enfield: Cat Hill and Trent Park. These sites both closed in 2011 and courses were relocated to the Hendon campus.

Oak Hill Theological College, an associate college of Middlesex University, is located in the borough.

Capel Manor College also offers various courses.

London Fire Brigade
The London Borough of Enfield has three fire stations; Edmonton, Enfield and Southgate. However, if an incident requires a higher attendance, appliances from throughout London can be mobilised to meet the needs of the area if required.

The three fire stations operate a total of five pumping appliances, one rescue tender, a command unit and a USAR unit.

Of the three fire stations within the borough, Enfield is mobilised to the most incidents and has the largest station ground (the area of which Enfield is the first appliance to attend).

Museums
The borough's museums include Forty Hall and the garden exhibitions at Capel Manor, Myddleton House (part of the Lee Valley Park) and the Whitewebbs Museum of Transport.
The Borough's own museum is based in Thomas Hardy House, 39 London Road.

Youth activities

Scouting and Guiding have many groups within Enfield. The annual St George's Day Parade has around a thousand young people marching through Enfield Town, led by the Enfield District Scout Band.

The Boys' and Girls' Brigade are also quite active within the borough, participating in various ceremonies and events throughout the year, including the Enfield Town Show, St Georges Day Parade and on Remembrance Day Parade.

The Air Training Corps has three units in the area, No.85 (Enfield & Southgate) Squadron based in Winchmore Hill and Enfield Town, No.1159 (Edmonton) Squadron based in Edmonton, No.1571 (Ayleward) Squadron based in Aylward School and No.2473 (Highlands & Southgate) Squadron in Highlands School, Southgate.

The Red Room music and film project ran from 2008 – 2014 based in Ponders End, aimed at 13 – 19 year olds supported and funded by Enfield Council.

Media
The Enfield Independent provides local news.

Sport and recreation
Enfield's King George's Field, named in memory of King George V, includes the Queen Elizabeth II athletics stadium, the Enfield Ignatians Rugby Club and numerous football, rugby and baseball diamonds. The playing fields were used as a POW camp for Italians during World War II.

The second largest playing fields are at Firs Farm on Firs Lane. There are a handful of rugby pitches along with more than a dozen football pitches. These are used by local amateur football clubs including Winchmore Hill Football Club, Mayfield Athletic FC and Southgate County FC. The pitches drain reasonably well but are generally in poor condition with old, rusted goalposts. The changing facilities are also very dilapidated, with some changing rooms being no more than concrete sheds with corrugated roofs.

Many sports teams and clubs are located in Enfield; Winchmore Hill Sports Club, Winchmore Hill Football Club, Enfield Town F.C., Enfield 1893 F.C., Cockfosters F.C., Enfield Borough F.C. and Futsal Club Enfield are the most prominent. The once successful football club, Enfield FC, were forced into a nomadic existence after the sale of their Southbury Road ground and became defunct at the end of the 2006/2007 season after years of ground sharing at many Hertfordshire based clubs. Enfield 1893 were formed after Enfield FC's demise and have spent time groundsharing at Ware FC and Broxbourne Borough FC. They finally found a ground in the borough when they merged with Brimsdown Rovers for the start of the 2011/2012 season. Saracens Rugby Football Club used to play in Enfield and still train at Bramley Road sports ground near Cockfosters.

The principal cricket clubs in the area are Enfield, Winchmore Hill Cricket Club , Edmonton and Southgate, with many others playing cricket in and around the borough such as, Enfield Invicta, Mayfield CC, Myddleton House, North Enfield CC, Botany Bay and Holtwhites Trinibis CC. Many clubs play in either the Middlesex Cricket League or the Hertfordshire League. Enfield, Southgate, and Winchmore Hill have long been the area's most successful cricket clubs, regularly competing in the Middlesex Premier League. Enfield (in 1988) and Southgate (in 1977) are both past winners of the ECB National Club Cricket Championship

The main swimming club in the borough is Enfield Swim Squad, which was created from an amalgamation of Edmonton Phoenix S.C. and Griffins S.C. of Enfield.

Futsal is also played in the area with Futsal Club Enfield who were founded in 2007 playing in the National Futsal League Premiership South Division for 2019/20.

Gaelic Football is also played in the area. The club North London Shamrocks play at Enfield Playing Fields.

Enfield Phoenix is the local basketball club with teams playing in the National League and the Central London League. The team play at the Edmonton Leisure Centre, Edmonton Green with seating for 400 spectators.

Theatre goers are catered for by the Intimate Theatre, the Millfield Theatre, the Dugdale Centre and the Chickenshed Theatre Company, with amateur and professional shows, dance pieces, musicals and live music on show. Amateur dramatic companies include Saint Monica's Players, The Capel Players and The London Pantomimers. Talkies Community Cinema screens British Independent and specialist films in a range of venues across the borough.

Tottenham Hotspur Football Club's new training ground is located in Enfield at Bulls Cross. 

Enfield is the home to the annual Livestock Music Festival. It is also home to Cheerleading squads- Sapphire Elite Cheerleaders, North London Wildcats and Enfield Blaze All-star Cheerleaders.

Croquet is played at Enfield Croquet Club in Bush Hill Park.

The first international branch of the WWE Performance Center was opened in Enfield's Great Cambridge Industrial Estate on 11 January 2019. The center is used by the WWE as a professional wrestling school to train potential future wrestlers from across the globe, as well as a training centre for current WWE wrestlers.

Transport
In 1840 the first section of the Northern and Eastern Railway was opened from Stratford to Broxbourne, with stations at Water Lane (Angel Road) and Ponders End. Further stations were added in 1855 at Enfield Lock (Royal Small Arms Factory) and 1884 at Brimsdown. A branch line from Water Lane to Enfield Town was opened in 1849 serving Edmonton Low Level and Enfield Town. A further station was added in 1880 at Bush Hill Park. The direct line from London to Enfield Town was opened in 1872 with stations at Silver Street and Lower Edmonton (now called Edmonton Green). In 1891, a loop from Edmonton serving Southbury (Churchbury) and Turkey Street (Forty Hill) to Cheshunt on the main line was added. The Cheshunt and Enfield Town services are currently served by London Overground.

In 1871 the Great Northern Railway opened its station on Windmill Hill. This was later replaced in 1910 when the line was extended to Cuffley. This section of railway is now part of the line commonly known as the Hertford Loop.

Enfield is served by the Piccadilly line of the London Underground with stations at Arnos Grove, Southgate, Oakwood (named as Enfield West when it first opened) and Cockfosters (where the line terminates). Suburban London Overground and National Rail Great Northern services also run within the borough.

There are numerous bus services throughout the borough run by Transport for London.

The main roads running through the borough include the North Circular Road, the M25, Green Lanes, the A10 and the old Hertford Road (A1010).

In March 2011, the main forms of transport that residents used to travel to work were: driving a car or van, 26.1% of all residents aged 16–74; underground, metro, light rail, tram, 8.2%; bus, minibus or coach, 8.2%; train, 7.3%; on foot, 4.0%; work mainly at or from home, 2.7%; passenger in a car or van, 1.6%.

Town twinning

Enfield is twinned with:
 Courbevoie, Hauts-de-Seine, Île-de-France, France
 Gladbeck, North Rhine-Westphalia, Germany
 Halandri, Greece
 Sarıyer, Turkey
 Schwechat, Lower Austria, Austria
 Wandlitz, Brandenburg, Germany
 Freudenstadt, Baden-Württemberg, Germany

See also
Enfield parks and open spaces
List of churches in the London Borough of Enfield
List of districts in Enfield
List of people from Enfield

References

External links
 Enfield Council

 
Enfield
1965 establishments in the United Kingdom